Vikramaadhithan is a 1962 Indian Tamil-language film starring M. G. Ramachandran, Padmini and Sriranjini. This film was in production as early as 1957, but released only on 27 October 1962.

Plot 

Vikramaadhithan was a king of Ujjain. He killed Nganaseedor a Munivar in order to save an innocent girl. Vikramaadhithan married Amaranaattu princess Rathinamaalai. The brothers of Nganaseedor grow enmity on Vikramaadhithan. Vikramaadhithan killed Karthigayan and at last Paramanandam (brothers of Nganaseedor) and saved princess Muthunagai from Sivanandipuram. He saved his wife Rathinamaalai from Madurapuri king where Vikramaadhithan disguised himself and worked as commander.

Cast 
 M. G. Ramachandran as Vikramaadhithan
 Padmini as Princess Rathnamalai
 Sriranjini as Princess Muthunagai
 P. S. Veerappa as Madhurapuri King
 Ragini as Princess Vairamalai
 K. A. Thangavelu as Vairavan
 M. Saroja as Vaadaamalligai
 Rushyendramani as Queen Sathyavani
 C. K. Saraswathi as Vaadaamalligai's mother

Production 
One fight sequence was filmed over three days at Vauhini Studios.

Soundtrack 
The music was composed by S. Rajeswara Rao. Lyrics were by Pattukkottai Kalyanasundaram, Kannadasan, A. Maruthakasi, M. K. Athmanathan, Puratchidasan, 'En Thangai' Natarajan, Saravanabhavanandhar, Clown Sundaram & A. Lakshmanadas.

References

External links 

1960s Tamil-language films
1962 films
Films directed by T. R. Raghunath
Memorials to Vikramaditya